Hermopolis, also known as Hermopolis Parva, was the Greek name for two cities in ancient Egypt. One was the capital of Tehuti, the 15th nome of Lower Egypt, situated a little below Thmuis (Strabo xvii. p. 802; Steph. B. s. v.).  The site is currently at Tell al-Naqus near Baqliya. The ancient Egyptian names of this city were Ba'h and Weprehwy or Rehehui. 

The other Hermopolis Parva was the capital of the 7th nome of Lower Egypt, and is now known as Damanhur. The ancient Egyptian name of this city was A-ment or Iment.

References

Cities in ancient Egypt
Former populated places in Egypt